Birci is a village in the District of Koçarlı, Aydın Province, Turkey. As of 2022, it had a population of 186 people.

References

Villages in Koçarlı District